David Karlsson may refer to:

 David Karlsson (bandy) (born 1981), Swedish bandy player
 David Karlsson (wrestler) (1881–1946), Swedish wrestler
 David Lillieström Karlsson (born 1993), Swedish ice hockey player
 David Moberg Karlsson (born 1994), Swedish footballer

See also 
 David Carlsson (disambiguation)